The Personal Touch is a 1980 studio album by Oscar Peterson, featuring songs written by or made popular by Canadians.

Track listing
 "Some of These Days" (Shelton Brooks) – 3:46
 "I'll Never Smile Again" (Ruth Lowe) – 2:31
 "The Waltz I Blew for Yew" (Rob McConnell) – 3:51
 "The Swingin' Shepherd Blues" (Moe Koffman) – 3:23
 "Wheels of Life" (Gino Vannelli) – 3:37
 "Spinning Wheel" (David Clayton-Thomas) – 4:06
 "Summer's Going" (Steve Cassini, Nick Kolisnyk) – 4:10
 "The World Is Waiting for the Sunrise" (Gene Lockhart, Ernest Seitz) – 2:22
 "You Needed Me" (Randy Goodrum) – 3:50
 "Theme for Celine" (Oscar Peterson) – 3:33
 "Sweethearts on Parade" (Carmen Lombardo, Charles Newman) – 2:25
 "Sometimes When We Touch" (Dan Hill, Barry Mann) – 5:04
 "The Personal Touch" (Peterson) – 0:56

Personnel

Performance
 Oscar Peterson – piano, vocal
 Clark Terry – flugelhorn
 Dave Young – double bass
 Ed Bickert – guitar
 Peter Leitch – guitar
 Jerry Fuller – drums

References

1980 albums
Vocal jazz albums
Oscar Peterson albums
Albums produced by Norman Granz
Pablo Records albums